The South and North Carolina Railroad was a railroad that served South Carolina in the late 19th century.

The line had been chartered by the South Carolina General Assembly in 1882 under the name of the Bishopville Railroad Company.

Around the time the 19-mile line was opened around 1892, its name was changed to the South and North Carolina Railroad.

The line was sold to the Manchester and Augusta Railroad Company on January 1, 1896, and became part of the Atlantic Coast Line Railroad in 1898.

References

Defunct South Carolina railroads
Railway companies established in 1892
Railway companies disestablished in 1896